Marlon Matheus Lopes do Nascimento (born 13 February 1994), simply known as Marlon, is a Brazilian footballer who plays as left back for América Mineiro.

Club career
Marlon was born in Angra dos Reis, Rio de Janeiro, and finished his formation with Bonsucesso. He made his senior debut with the club on 16 September 2012 by starting in a 0–1 Copa Rio away loss against Angra dos Reis, and scored his first goal on 24 October in a 2–4 loss at Bangu.

In 2014, Marlon moved to Ituano, but appeared mainly for the under-20 squad. He joined America-RJ for the 2015 campaign, before signing for Luverdense in April of the following year. He then moved back to América in April 2017, after being rarely used by LEC.

For the 2019 campaign, Marlon represented Cabofriense and Portuguesa-RJ. He agreed to a contract with Madureira on 5 December of that year, before being one of the 11 additions of Sampaio Corrêa for the 2020 Série B on 8 July 2020.

On 28 April 2021, Marlon was loaned to Série A side América Mineiro until May 2022. He made his top tier debut on 30 May, starting in a 0–1 away loss against Athletico Paranaense.

On 30 November 2021, Marlon signed a permanent deal with Coelho until the end of 2024, effective as of the following 1 January.

Career statistics

Honours
America-RJ
 Campeonato Carioca Série B1: 2015, 2018

Luverdense
 Copa Verde: 2017

Sampaio Corrêa
 Campeonato Maranhense: 2020

References

External links

1994 births
Living people
People from Angra dos Reis
Sportspeople from Rio de Janeiro (state)
Brazilian footballers
Association football defenders
Campeonato Brasileiro Série A players
Campeonato Brasileiro Série B players
Bonsucesso Futebol Clube players
Ituano FC players
America Football Club (RJ) players
Luverdense Esporte Clube players
Associação Desportiva Cabofriense players
Madureira Esporte Clube players
Sampaio Corrêa Futebol Clube players
América Futebol Clube (MG) players